Orion Bus Industries, also known as Bus Industries of America in the United States, was a private bus manufacturer based in Mississauga, Ontario, Canada.

The company had its main manufacturing plant in Mississauga and sent bus body shells to their plant in Oriskany, New York, for final assembly and testing of vehicles destined for U.S. markets. Manufacturing ended in 2013.

The company was taken over by the Ontario Government in 1994 for loan arrears and was sold in 1995 to Western Star Truck Holdings. Until 1995, the word Orion was only a model or brand name, not part of the company's name. In 2000, Western Star was purchased by a division of DaimlerChrysler, and in 2006, Orion was absorbed into DaimlerChrysler Commercial Buses North America. For some period of time thereafter, DaimlerChrysler  continued to market its buses under the "Orion" brand name.

Corporate history 
The company was founded in Mississauga in 1975 as Ontario Bus and Truck, Inc., a private company led by Arnold Wollschlaeger. It was renamed Ontario Bus Industries (OBI) in 1977 and introduced its first prototype bus in 1978, under the model name Orion I. Don Sheardown purchased the company from Wollschlaeger's estate in 1979. A U.S. subsidiary named Bus Industries of America, wholly owned by Ontario Bus Industries, was incorporated in 1981 in Oriskany, New York, to serve the U.S. market. Subsequent models built by OBI or BIA continued to use the "Orion" brand name, with the Orion II being introduced in 1983 as the first low-floor heavy duty bus and the prototype Orion VI, the company's first low-floor bus, being produced in 1993. 

At its height in the early 1990s, Ontario Bus Industries employed 1,200 at its Mississauga and Oriskany plants, producing 900 buses per year. OBI was taken over by the Ontario Government in 1994 for loan arrears; by that time, the Mississauga plant only had 165 employees. The $81 million investment, which consisted of forgiving $66M in loans and an additional $15M investment, was criticized by Monte Kwinter as "a total disaster". It was sold in 1995 to Western Star Truck Holdings of Kelowna for $35M, which also acquired OBI subsidiary Bus Industries of America, and Western Star adopted a new, single name for both companies, Orion Bus Industries. 

In July 2000, parent company Western Star Trucks was acquired by Freightliner, a division of DaimlerChrysler (now Mercedes-Benz Group), and became part of the group Daimler Buses North America. In 2006, Orion Bus Industries became part of the DaimlerChrysler Commercial Buses North America as a subsidiary of Daimler.  It continued to market its buses under the "Orion" brand name.

In September 2007, employees representing the United Auto Workers in the Orion plant in Oriskany went on strike for three weeks.

On April 25, 2012, the company announced it would stop taking orders for new buses, and the Mississauga and Oriskany plants would close once outstanding orders were fulfilled. The closure took union officials by surprise; CAW had just signed a one-year extension on April 1 for the Mississauga plant. It was announced that more than 530 workers would be laid off in the Mississauga and Oriskany plants. The Mississauga workers staged a wildcat work stoppage to protest in employee frustration at the slow pace of winding-down talks. New Flyer assumed some outstanding orders with Orion for New York City Transit and King County Metro.

The Oriskany plant was initially retained for aftermarket parts and support for Orion bus operators, until New Flyer acquired that business from Daimler Buses in 2013. The New York location also performed repairs, including a retrofit program with BAE Systems for recalled hybrid-electric buses using BAE's HybriDrive system, until it was refitted as an assembly facility for New Flyer buses.

The sales and closures were part of the closure of Daimler Buses North America; only Daimler's imported Setra buses continued to be marketed in North America although distribution rights were taken over by Motor Coach Industries (MCI) in exchange for a minority stake in MCI. MCI itself was purchased by New Flyer in 2015, and the Setra distribution rights lasted until January 2018, when the REV Group took over distribution. Setra became part of the newly renamed Daimler Coaches North America in January 2020 when Daimler once again distributed Setra coaches.

Product lineup 

Orion manufactured a number of different models of buses over its 37-year existence. A list of models is given below; each increasing number is the next generation model.

Most buses today in service are of the Orion V or VII models. Orion also marketed the Thomas Dennis SLF 200 mid-sized bus.

Notes

See also

Crown-Ikarus 286, similar to the Orion-Ikarus III bus

References

External links

 Orion Buses
 Educated » Hybrid Sounds
 Crown Ikarus 286

Hybrid buses
 Hybrid buses.
  

Vehicle manufacturing companies established in 1975
Vehicle manufacturing companies disestablished in 2013
Bus manufacturers of Canada
Daimler Truck
Former Crown corporations of Canada
Manufacturing companies based in Mississauga
Oneida County, New York
Hybrid electric bus manufacturers
1975 establishments in Ontario
2013 disestablishments in Ontario
Defunct bus manufacturers
Electric vehicle manufacturers of Canada